Louise Lyngh Bjerregaard is a Danish fashion designer based in Paris.

Bjerregaard was born in Copenhagen, the youngest child in her family. She studied tailoring at the Scandinavian Academy of Fashion Design in Copenhagen, where she interned with designers Anne Sofie Madsen and Mike Eckhaus. She then attended a course on knitwear at Central Saint Martins in London, where she worked with incredibly delicate yarn.

Bjerregaard launched her namesake womanswear brand in 2019.

Her work has been featured at a number of institutions including Maison du Danemark, the National Gallery of Denmark, and Moderna Museet Malmö.

‍She is best known for her textile expertise and artistic knitwear, although in an interview with Dazed, Bjerregaard stated that she "felt the need to break out of the knitwear label that’s been put on her name", asserting that her brand was not a knitwear label. Her brand is also known for its zero-waste policy and sustainability.

Bjerregaard had her runway debut during Couture Week in Paris. She debuted her Spring Summer 2022 collection at Copenhagen Fashion Week in August 2021. Earlier that year, she was shortlisted as finalist at the 2021 Zalando Sustainability Award and the 2021 Magasin du Nord Fashion Prize.

External links 

 Official website

References 

Year of birth missing (living people)
Living people
Designers from Copenhagen
Danish fashion designers
Textile arts of Denmark
Danish women fashion designers
21st-century Danish women artists